The 34th Congress of the Liberal Democratic Party of Russia was be held on 27 May 2022 to elect a new party leader, after the death of Vladimir Zhirinovsky.

Background

Since the founding of the party in 1989, its permanent leader was Vladimir Zhirinovsky. Zhirinovsky was the party's presidential candidate in almost all elections (except the 2004 election), and headed the party's list in all federal parliamentary elections, and also always headed the party's lists in all regional parliamentary elections.

In February 2022, Zhirinovsky was hospitalized in critical condition in Moscow with COVID-19. In March, he was reportedly placed in a medically induced coma, and underwent treatment for COVID-19 complications such as sepsis and respiratory failure. Zhirinovsky claimed to have been vaccinated against COVID-19 eight times.

On 25 March 2022, Zhirinovsky was reported to have died in a hospital. Despite confirmation from several sources, including his own political party, the news was quickly denied by family members. On 6 April 2022, Vyacheslav Volodin, the Speaker of the Duma, announced that Zhirinovsky had died following a long illness. He was 75. In a statement after Zhirinovsky died, President Vladimir Putin said he "always defended his patriotic position and Russia's interests before any audience and in the fiercest of debates". Putin and other politicians including Sergey Shoygu and Vyacheslav Volodin attended Zhirinovsky's funeral which was officiated by Patriarch Kirill of Moscow.

Candidates

Declared candidates

Speculative candidates
After Zhirinovsky's death, assumptions about candidates for the post of the new party leader began to appear in the media.

Boris Chernyshov, member of the State Duma, deputy chair of the State Duma;
Alexei Didenko, member of the State Duma, chair of the State Duma Committee on Regional Policy and Local Government, First Deputy Head of the Central Office of the party;
Igor Lebedev, former member of the State Duma, son of Vladimir Zhirinovsky;
Andrey Lugovoy, member of the State Duma;
Yaroslav Nilov, member of the State Duma, chair of the State Duma Committee on Labour, Social Policy and Veterans' Affairs;
Alexey Ostrovsky, Governor of Smolensk Oblast;
Boris Paikin, member of the State Duma;
Dmitry Rogozin, CEO of the Roskosmos, former Deputy Prime Minister, former member of the State Duma, former leader of the Rodina party (not party member);
Leonid Slutsky, member of the State Duma, chair of the State Duma Committee on International Affairs, State Duma leader of the party;
Vasily Vlasov, member of the State Duma.

Declined to be candidates
The individuals in this section have been the subject of speculation about their possible candidacy, but have publicly denied interest in running.

Vladimir Solovyov, journalist (not party member).

Endorsements

References

34
LDPR